Patricia Lee Buckley Bozell (April 23, 1927 – July 12, 2008) was an American author. She helped to establish and served as managing editor of Triumph, a Catholic opinion journal that was published for nearly a decade. A native of New York City and a graduate of Vassar College, she was a freelance editor at Regnery Publishing, National Review, The American Spectator, and Communio: International Catholic Review.

A daughter of William Frank Buckley Sr., and Aloise Steiner Buckley, Patricia Buckley was the wife of L. Brent Bozell Jr. (son of Bozell Worldwide co-founder Leo Brent Bozell), the mother of Media Research Center founder L. Brent Bozell III, and a sister of conservative author William F. Buckley Jr. as well as United States Senator James L. Buckley. She and her husband were also the godparents to novelist Tristan Egolf.

Bozell is known for attempting to slap Ti-Grace Atkinson at an event at the Catholic University of America after Atkinson blasphemed Jesus Christ and the Virgin Mary.

References 

1927 births
2008 deaths
Buckley family
National Review people
Writers from New York City
People from Sharon, Connecticut
People from Camden, South Carolina
Writers from Washington, D.C.
20th-century American women writers
20th-century American non-fiction writers
American women non-fiction writers
Catholics from Connecticut
Catholics from South Carolina